The 1950 Milan–San Remo was the 41st edition of the Milan–San Remo cycle race and was held on 18 March 1950. The race started in Milan and finished in San Remo. The race was won by Gino Bartali of the Bartali–Gardiol team.

General classification

References

1950
1950 in road cycling
1950 in Italian sport
Milan-San Remo
March 1950 sports events in Europe